The 1998 Oklahoma gubernatorial election was held on November 3, 1998, and was a race for Governor of Oklahoma.

Incumbent Republican Frank Keating won re-election in a landslide against Democratic State Representative Laura Boyd.  The Reform Party, the first alternative party to be able to run a candidate for governor in the state since 1970, had Hoppy Heidelberg as its candidate.  Heidelberg was removed from a gubernatorial debate that he disrupted after not being allowed to be a participant.

This was the first occasion since Oklahoma statehood that Bryan County, Carter County, Cotton County, Garvin County, Greer County, Harmon County, Jefferson County, Kiowa County, Love County, Murray County, and Pontotoc County voted for a Republican for Governor, although several of these counties backed Independent candidate Wes Watkins four years earlier.

Candidates

Republican
Frank Keating – incumbent Governor of Oklahoma, former Reagan Administration official
 Joe Vickers - perennial candidate, removed from the ballot after his candidacy was successfully challenged by Keating

Democrat
Laura Boyd – State Representative from Norman, Oklahoma
 James Hager - State Representative from Pawhuska, Oklahoma

Reform
Hoppy Heidelberg – former member of the Oklahoma City Bombing grand jury

Significance
The election is significant for two reasons:
1. It marked the first time a woman received the nomination for governor from a major party in Oklahoma.
2. It marked the first time a Republican was elected to a consecutive term (Henry Bellmon was the first Republican to serve two terms, though not consecutive).

Democratic primary

Results

General Election Results

References

 United States Presidential Election Results

1998
Gubernatorial
Oklahoma